Christopher Cain is an American screenwriter and actor.

Christopher or Chris Cain may also refer to:

Chris Cain, American guitarist
Chris Cain (We Are Scientists)

See also
Chris Caine (disambiguation)
Chris Kane (disambiguation)